The Rundfunkchor Berlin (Berlin Radio Choir) is a professional German classical choir founded in 1925.

In the 1950s the choir was divided into the Berliner Solistenvereinigung and the Großer Chor des Berliner Rundfunks. These were united as Rundfunkchor Berlin in 1973.

For Pentatone, the choir has recorded ten operas of Richard Wagner, the Mass in F minor by Anton Bruckner and Die Tageszeiten by Richard Strauss.

References

External links
 

German choirs
Musical groups established in 1925
Musical groups from Berlin